Stefan Ingo Mauk (born 12 October 1995) is an Australian professional footballer who plays for J2 League club Fagiano Okayama. An attacking midfielder, Mauk is also capable of playing as a box-to-box midfielder and as a right winger.

Personal life
Mauk attended Henley High School.
Mauk's father, Georg, died of cancer when Mauk was 15.

Club career

Melbourne City
Mauk joined Melbourne City as a sixteen-year-old in October 2012, signing a two-year contract after spending time at the Australian Institute of Sport.

Adelaide United
Mauk returned to Adelaide, his hometown, in January 2016 after signing with Adelaide United in a trade deal for Osama Malik, who moved to Melbourne.

N.E.C.
On 19 July 2016, Mauk signed a three-year contract at NEC in the Dutch Eredivisie. He made his competitive debut for the side in August 2016 against PEC Zwolle, but was substituted off at halftime in a 1–1 draw. Mauk subsequently fell out of favour at NEC, leading to reports that he would be loaned out in January 2017. No move eventuated, and Mauk remained at the club in May 2017, but still yet to add to his early-season appearance, when manager Peter Hyballa was sacked. Mauk finished the season with three appearances in all competitions as NEC were relegated to the Eerste Divisie, after which Mauk declared his intention to find a new club, citing that he wanted to play more regularly and in a different league.

Loan to Melbourne City
Mauk returned to Australia on a season-long loan deal, linking with former club Melbourne City for the 2017–18 season.

Brisbane Roar
On 28 May 2018, Mauk joined Brisbane Roar on a four-year deal from NEC.

Adelaide United
On 30 January 2020, Mauk left Brisbane Roar to rejoin Adelaide United. He was announced as the club's new captain on 1 December 2020, becoming the fifth South Australian player in the club's history to take on this role.

Fagiano Okayama
On 22 February 2022, following a long and impressive spell in A-League, he was announced officially by J2 League club Fagiano Okayama, joining in a complete transfer from Adelaide United.

International career
Mauk was first called up to the Australian squad for a friendly against England played on 27 May 2016.

Honours
Adelaide United
 A-League Premiers: 2015–16
 A-League Championship: 2015–16

Individual
 Rising Star Award: 2015–16

References

External links
 
 

Living people
1995 births
Association football midfielders
Australian soccer players
Australian expatriate soccer players
Australia under-20 international soccer players
A-League Men players
Eredivisie players
Melbourne City FC players
Adelaide United FC players
NEC Nijmegen players
Brisbane Roar FC players
Expatriate footballers in the Netherlands
Australian people of Austrian descent